Mar George Alapatt (11 February 1900 – 6 November 1973) was the fourth Bishop of Syro-Malabar Catholic Archdiocese of Thrissur, from 1 May 1944 until 4 June 1970, when he retired.
Alapatt was born at Karanchira in Thrissur district on 11 February 1900. He attended all the four sessions of the Second Vatican Council (1962–1965). He died in his sleep on 6 November 1973.

References

1900 births
1973 deaths
St. Thomas College, Thrissur alumni
20th-century Roman Catholic bishops in India
Participants in the Second Vatican Council
Syro-Malabar bishops
Archbishops of Thrissur